Branimir is a Slavic male given name. It is a combination of the (Slavic) verb braniti ("to defend") and the noun mir ("the world" or "peace" in Old Slavic), and hence means "the one who defends the world/peace". It is especially common in Croatia, Serbia, Slovenia, Bosnia and Herzegovina, Bulgaria, Ukraine, the Czech Republic, Slovakia, and Poland. The female version is Branimira and Branimirka. The Polish version is Bronimir.

People named Branimir 
 Branimir of Croatia, medieval Croatian ruler
 Branimir Bajić, Bosnian footballer
 Branimir Glavaš, Croatian politician
 Branimir Jelić, Croatian politician
 Branimir Kostadinov, Bulgarian footballer
 Branimir Makanec, Croatian engineer
 Branimir Petrović, Serbian footballer
 Branimir Poljac, Norwegian footballer of Croatian descent
 Branimir Subašić, Azerbaijani footballer of Serbian descent
 Branimir "Johnny" Štulić, Yugoslavian musician
 Branimir Vujević, Croatian Olympic rower
 Branimir Djokic, famous Serbian accordionist

See also
 Branko
 Branislav
 Veselin Branimirov

Slavic masculine given names
Bulgarian masculine given names
Croatian masculine given names
Bosnian masculine given names
Serbian masculine given names
Czech masculine given names
Macedonian masculine given names
Montenegrin masculine given names

Slovak masculine given names
Slovene masculine given names
Polish masculine given names
Ukrainian masculine given names